Gokayama Dam is a gravity dam located in Fukuoka Prefecture in Japan. The dam is used for flood control and water supply. The catchment area of the dam is 18.9 km2. The dam impounds about 130  ha of land when full and can store 40200 thousand cubic meters of water. The construction of the dam was started on 1983 and completed in 2017.

References

Dams in Fukuoka Prefecture
2017 establishments in Japan